The black-throated antshrike (Frederickena viridis) is a species of bird in the family Thamnophilidae. It is found in the Guiana Shield and adjacent northern Brazil. Its natural habitat is subtropical or tropical moist lowland forests.

References

black-throated antshrike
Birds of the Brazilian Amazon
Birds of the Guianas
black-throated antshrike
Taxa named by Louis Jean Pierre Vieillot
Taxonomy articles created by Polbot